Sharovka is a rural locality (a village) and the administrative centre of Sharovsky Selsoviet, Belebeyevsky District, Bashkortostan, Russia. The population was 365 as of 2010. There are 4 streets.

Geography 
Sharovka is located 27 km southeast of Belebey (the district's administrative centre) by road. Bulanovka is the nearest rural locality.

References 

Rural localities in Belebeyevsky District